"Voices" is a 1999 song recorded by British Italian-based singer Ann Lee. As the follow-up to her successful hit "2 Times", it was co-written by Lee with Marco Soncini and Paul Sears, and released on her debut album, Dreams (1999). The single was a moderate success in Europe, peaking within the top 10 in the Czech Republic, Denmark (number three) and Spain. Additionally it reached the top 20 in Austria, Belgium and Scotland. In 2000, it peaked at number 27 on the UK Singles Chart. On the Eurochart Hot 100, it reached number 55 in November 1999. The accompanying music video for "Voices" sees Ann Lee performing in a forest, among giant mushrooms.

Track listing

 12" single, Italy (1999)
"Voices" (Original Extended) – 6:35
"Voices" (Funk J.A. Extended) – 5:31
"Voices" (G. Side) – 5:51
"Voices" (Funk J.A. Dub) – 5:15

 CD single, Netherlands (1999)
"Voices" (CTO Radio Edit) – 3:30
"Voices" (Original Edit) – 4:01

 CD maxi, Italy (1999)
"Voices" (Original Edit) – 4:01
"Voices" (Funk J.A. Extended) – 5:51
"Voices" (G. Side) – 5:51
"Voices" (Original Extended) – 6:35
"Voices" (Funk J.A. Dub) – 5:15

 CD single, UK (2000)
"Voices" (Original Edit) – 3:34
"Voices" (Alterain Remix Edit) – 3:52
"2 Times" (Masterboy-Beat-Production Remix) – 5:44

 CD maxi, Germany (2000)
"Voices" (Radio Edit) – 3:16
"Voices" (Do Do Do Edit) – 4:01
"Voices" (Snapshot Remix) – 4:19
"Voices" (Alterain Remix Edit) – 3:47
"Voices" (Extended Organ Remix) – 6:34
"Voices" (Bulletproof Remix) – 6:31
"Voices" (Snapshot Club Remix) – 5:43

Charts

References

 

1999 singles
1999 songs
Eurodance songs
Songs written by Ann Lee (singer)
ZYX Music singles